Romani people in Kosovo are part of the wider Muslim Romani people community, the biggest minority group in Europe. Kosovo Roma speak the Balkan Romani language in most cases, but also the languages that surround them, such as Serbian and Albanian. They are Cultural Muslims. In 2011 there were 36,694 Romani, Ashkali and Balkan Egyptians living in Kosovo. However, the minorities are unrelated to each other and were only put together based on  appearance.

Many Romani were targeted by the Kosovo Liberation Army along with Serbs during the Kosovo War as they were considered to be allied with Serbs and Serbian national interests. Romani in Kosovo are much depleted from their former numbers, and have been in both stationary and nomadic residence there since the 15th century. The Kosovo Liberation Army were reported to have expelled 50,000 Romani from Kosovo, forcing them to take refuge in central Serbia, but many of them have since returned to Kosovo.

Subgroups

As in other parts of the Balkans, the denomination of Romani has always been subject to outside pressure. In the official census, the label Romani is used officially by the state.

Serbian Romani:
Kovači (Serbian Orthodox)
Čergari (Serbian Orthodox)
Srpski Romani (Serbian Orthodox)
Bugurdjije

Polylingual:
Arlije  (Cultural Muslims)
Mixed Romani

 

Albanian Romani:
Gurbeti (Cultural Muslims
Belajie (Cultural Muslims)
Muhadjeri (Cultural Muslims)
Ashkali (Cultural Muslims) (self-identify)

Other:
Turkish Roma
Divanjoldjije (Cultural Muslims)
Croat Romani 
Lipljan Romani (Catholic)
Janjevo Romani (Catholic)

Political representation
Four seats in the Assembly of Kosovo are reserved for parties representing the Romani, Ashkali and Balkan Egyptian communities.

Romani political parties in Kosovo
United Roma Party of Kosovo
Kosovar New Romani Party

Culture
While all the three groups claim ethnic differences between them, they frequently intermarry. Romani weddings to non-Romani (Gadje, outsiders) are extremely rare, but Romani and Ashkalija do not classify one another as Gadje.

Education 
Formal education is of a poor standard, especially among women, due both to native beliefs that formal education is unnecessary, and to discrimination in education in the formal schools who are ill-equipped for the needs of Romani children. Serbianising and Albanizing tendencies have also led to the Romani sliding from the educational mainstream. Third-level education is not attained by the majority of Roma, and of those who do, they are mostly only half Romani, with there being Serb, Turk or Albanian heritage, too.

Discrimination

Following the cessation of the Kosovo war in June 1999 and the subsequent return of ethnic Albanians from abroad, approximately four fifths of Kosovo's pre-1999 RAE population had been expelled from their homes. Many Kosovo Albanians regarded the Roma as having collaborated with the Yugoslav Army. Roma were claimed to have assisted the Serbian police in plundering Albanian homes and shops to supply the military action, and in burying the Albanian dead. According to Roma accounts, the Yugoslav authorities coerced them into providing assistance. Many Roma were also recruited into the Yugoslav Army to "help terrorise Albanians" and Roma homes were marked with an "R" on their doors to distinguish them from Albanian houses when the Serbian paramilitaries arrived to plunder.

Albanians regarded these acts as further evidence that Roma had allied themselves with the enemies of the Albanian nation, and thus many Roma were targeted by the returning Albanians. The departure of the Yugoslav army and police was followed by a series of "retaliatory attacks". By June 1999, the Romani mahala of Mitrovica was burned down and the inhabitants fled. Around 3,500 Roma took shelter in a school in Kosovo Polje following threats and the Roma community of Gjakova were warned to leave their homes. The Romani quarter of Brekoc in Gjakova and Dusanova in Prizren were also burned down. German KFOR troops also discovered 15 severely beaten Roma, accused of taking part in looting and collaborating with the Serbs, in a police office in Prizren that was being used by the KLA as a prison. 5,000 displaced Roma gathered in a KFOR built camp in Obilić where they were subject to insults and attacks by Albanians.

Romani in Kosovo today live in constant fear of further ethnic unrest. Romani displaced in North Kosovo are today housed in lead-infested camps in North Mitrovica. There is ongoing campaign for rehousing and proper health provisions for the families affected, and a fatality estimate ranges from 27 to 81.

Mitrovica camps

Returning IDPs were housed by UNMIK in North Mitrovica in a lead mine site, and 27 died of lead poisoning.

See also
Ashkali and Balkan Egyptians
Romani people in Albania

References

Sources

External links
Who we Were, Who we Are: Kosovo Roma Oral History Collection. The most comprehensive collection of information on Kosovo's Roma in existence. (English)

Ethnic groups in Kosovo
Ethnic groups in Serbia
 
Romani in Serbia